SKAT  was the tax authority of Denmark from 2005 until its reorganization in 2018 as a result of several serious scandals. It had been the state authority under which the Danish Treasury calculated and collected taxes and levied charges. The authority also undertook property valuation and settlement of debts. 

SKAT was organized into different core units and 30 local tax centers. Tax Centers are located across the country although Danish citizens can in principle apply to any tax center. There were also 22 customs operations. SKAT had been created by the merger of the National Customs and Tax Administration and the municipal tax administrations.

From 1 July 2018, Skatteforvaltningen took over the responsibilities of the former SKAT, and Skatteforvaltningen became a group of 7 different tax agencies with specific areas and functions, with the agencies continuing to share the skat.dk website.

History

2019 Copenhagen tax office bombing 
In August 2019, a powerful bomb detonated and damaged a tax office building in Copenhagen and one person was wounded by splinters. Swedish citizens Nurettin Nuray Syuleyman and Zacharias Tamer Hamzi were found guilty by Copenhagen City Court, sentenced to a prison sentence and thereafter permanently banned from returning to Denmark.

Scandals

Dividend tax

Closing
Following a number of serious scandals that plagued SKAT between 2000 and 2016, it was decided on 12 June 2017, to close SKAT in 2018, instead creating seven new agencies with specialized areas.

See also
CumEx-Files
Sanjay Shah
Hanno Berger (de)
Macquarie Group

References

External links
 

Revenue services